The canoe marathon competition at the 2022 World Games took place in July 2022, in Birmingham in United States, at the Oak Mountain State Park.
Originally scheduled to take place in July 2021, the Games have been rescheduled for July 2022 as a result of the 2020 Summer Olympics postponement due to the COVID-19 pandemic.
 This was the first time, when canoe marathon was an official discipline in The World Games programme (in 2013 it was an invitational event).

Qualification

Participating nations

Medal table

Medalists

Men

Women

References

External links
 The World Games 2022
 Planet Canoe
 Results book

 
2022 World Games